Arkleby railway station was an early railway station on the Maryport and Carlisle Railway, in north-west England, close to the village of Arkleby in Cumbria, closing in 1852.

References

Disused railway stations in Cumbria
Former Maryport and Carlisle Railway stations
Railway stations in Great Britain opened in 1840 
Railway stations in Great Britain closed in 1852
1840 establishments in England
1852 disestablishments in England